Magbalik ka, Hirang is a 1940 Filipino film directed by Lorenzo P. Tuells. It stars Rosa Aguirre, Nemesio E. Caravana and Justina David.

External links
 

1940 films
Tagalog-language films
Philippine black-and-white films
Philippine musical drama films
1940s musical drama films
1940 drama films